S Cassiopeiae (S Cas, HD 7769) is a Mira variable and S-type star in the constellation Cassiopeia.  It is an unusually cool star, rapidly losing mass and surrounded by dense gas and dust producing masers.

Distance
In the absence of a measurement of its parallax by the Hipparcos satellite, its distance from the Solar System was estimated between 1,860 and 2,770 light-years.

Spectral type
With a spectral type of S3,4e-S5,8e, S Cassiopeiae is an S-type star similar to χ Cygni; these are asymptotic giant branch (AGB) stars similar to those of class M except that the dominant spectral bands of metal oxides are formed by metals of the fifth period of the periodic table as zirconium or yttrium.

Characteristics
S Cassiopeiae has a radius of 934 solar radii; if placed at the center of the Solar System, it would extend past the orbit of Mars and the Asteroid Belt. Its effective temperature is 1,800 K, which is exceptionally cool for any star, and its bolometric luminosity is 5,210 times that of the sun.

S Cassiopeiae is a variable Mira, a pulsating variable star whose visual brightness varies over several magnitudes with a somewhat regular period and amplitude. Its visual magnitude varies between +7.9 and +16.1 over an average period of 612.43 days. Mira variables are stars in the last stages of evolution whose instability comes from pulsations in their surfaces, causing changes in color and brightness. Some of them, including S Cassiopeiae show SiO maser emission.

See also
 TZ Cassiopeiae
 PZ Cassiopeiae
 List of largest stars
 T Cephei

References

S-type stars
Mira variables
Cassiopeia (constellation)
Cassiopeiae, S
J01194198+7236407
BD+71 66
IRAS catalogue objects
007769
Emission-line stars